Popinolashki waterfall is a waterfall in the Bulgaria's Pirin mountain. It is situated at less than 20 km from the town of Sandanski, in a country-side known as Popina laka. It is located at an altitude of 1,230 m on the current of the Bashliitsa river. Its height is estimated at 12 m. There are woodlands in the vicinity. On 11 October 1965 the waterfall was designated a natural landmark.

References 

Waterfalls of Bulgaria
Pirin
Sandanski
Landforms of Blagoevgrad Province